No. 683 Squadron RAF was a photo-reconnaissance squadron of the Royal Air Force during the Second World War and from August 1950 to November 1953.

History

Formation and World War II
683 squadron was formed out of 'B' Flight of No. 69 Squadron on 8 February 1943 at RAF Luqa on Malta, as a photo-reconnaissance squadron operating the Spitfire fighter in the photo-reconnaissance role. The squadron added the Mosquito Mk.VI to its strength in May 1943, but they were only operated for a month. The squadron was involved in photo-reconnaissance mission over Sicily and Italy and later over Yugoslavia.
The squadron moved to San Severo in Italy and continued in support of the US 5th Army. As the war continued it was involved in both tactical and strategic reconnaissance, and was involved survey flight across southern Europe. In September 1944, the squadron re-equipped with Spitfire PR.XIX photo-reconnaissance aircraft.
Detachments from the squadron were based at a wide range of bases all across the Italian theatre of operations, with the squadron finally disbanding on 22 September 1945 at San Severo, Italy.

Post war
The squadron was re-formed on 1 November 1950 at RAF Fayid, Egypt with the Avro Lancaster PR.1 and the Vickers Valetta C.1. It was tasked with the survey and mapping of Arabia and East Africa. In January 1952 the squadron moved to RAF Khormaksar, Aden to cover both Aden and Somaliland. Another move to RAF Habbaniya, Iraq allowed the squadron to survey and map the Persian Gulf. With the survey and mapping role completed the squadron was disbanded at Habbaniya on 30 November 1953.

Aircraft operated

Squadron bases

Commanding officers

See also
List of Royal Air Force aircraft squadrons

References

Notes

Bibliography

External links
 History of 683 Squadron
 No. 683 Squadron RAF movement and equipment history
 Squadron Histories and more of Nos. 671–1435 Squadron on RAFweb

683 Squadron
Aircraft squadrons of the Royal Air Force in World War II
Military units and formations established in 1944
Reconnaissance units and formations of the Royal Air Force
Military units and formations disestablished in 1953